"She's So Far Away" is a song by J.M. Silk, taken from the album Hold on to Your Dream, which was released in 1987 on RCA Records.

The single was written by Keith Nunnally, and it peaked in the UK Singles Chart at number eighty. On B-side of the release appeared a remix of their UK number one hit, "Jack Your Body".

Credits and personnel
Keith Nunnally – lead vocal, writer
Steve Hurley – producer
Larry Sturm – producer
Phil Balsano – producer
Crocodile – art work

Official versions
"She's So Far Away (LP Version)" – 3:45
"She's So Far Away (Single Mix)" – 7:11

Charts

See also
List of artists who reached number one on the US Dance chart

References

External links
 [ Steve "Silk" Hurley] on AllMusic
 [ J.M. Silk] on AllMusic

1987 singles
Steve "Silk" Hurley songs
1986 songs
RCA Records singles
Songs written by Keith Nunnally